Ulaş Tuna Astepe (born 5 May 1988) is a Turkish actor.

Biography 
Ulaş Tuna Astepe was born on 5 May 1988 in İzmit. He finished his elementary and secondary education in İzmit, and the enrolled in Istanbul High School.

In 2008, Astepe worked as a costume assistant on the set of The Ottoman Republic, after which he appeared in several plays and TV series. He portrayed the character of Orhan in the TV series Karadayı, Mustafa in Analar ve Anneler dizisinde, Alaz in Rüya, and Tahir in Sen Anlat Karadeniz.

Astepe also had a role in the plays Bayrak and Babamın Cesetleri directed by Berkun Oya, and the Leaves of Glass which was brought on stage in Turkey by Sami Berat Marçalı.

He has also had roles in a number of short movies including Emre Yeksan's Körfez in which he played the character of Selim.

He currently shares the lead roles with Engin Altan Düzyatan, Yetkin Dikinciler and Pelin Akil in the historical epic drama Barbaroslar.

Filmography

TV series

Film

Short film

Theatre

References

External links 
 

1988 births
Living people
Turkish male film actors
Turkish male television actors
Turkish male stage actors
Male actors from Izmit